King Gwebi'nkumbi kaSigcawu (Salukaphathwa Sigcawu) was the king of the AmaXhosa Nation from 1902 until his death on the 30 May 1921. His father was King Sigcawu kaSarili.

King Gwebi'nkumbi had two sons King Mpisekhaya Ngangomhlaba Sigcawu and King Bungeni Zwelidumile Sigcawu (1906).

Salukaphathwa
Rulers of the Gcaleka
1921 deaths
Year of birth missing